Robert Jousie (or Joussie or Jowsie or Jossie; died 1626) was a Scottish merchant, financier, and courtier.

Life

Jousie was a cloth merchant based in Edinburgh with a house on the High Street or Royal Mile. He became an exclusive supplier of fabrics to James VI of Scotland and Anne of Denmark. His accounts for royal fabrics survive in the National Archives of Scotland, and have been quoted by historians including Hugo Arnot, who noted that James VI bought ostrich feathers and beaver hats. The record includes masque costumes for James VI and Anne of Denmark, who danced in masques at weddings in the first years of the 1590s. The masque clothes included lightweight taffeta and metallic tinsel or "tock" fabrics.

Royal marriage
Jousie lent money to the Scottish ambassador William Stewart, Commendator of Pittenweem, who was sent to Denmark in 1588, 1589, and 1590. Jousie also supplied silks and velvets to Stewart, and his debt totalled 3,600 merks.

Partnered with the goldsmith and financier Thomas Foulis, James VI sent him to London in July 1589 to buy clothes and ornaments in preparation for his marriage to Anna of Denmark. James gave them a pledge of two cut rubies and three cabochon rubies set in gold "chattons" or buttons from the crown jewels for these purchases.

Jousie and Foulis sometimes collected the subsidy money which Elizabeth I gave to James VI. In December 1591 Jousie was detained or delayed for a time in Berwick-upon-Tweed, and James wrote to Elizabeth of his "endless detaining" and an errand "turned from one honorable annuity to a voluntary uncertainty with long begging".

In April 1593 the English ambassador Lord Burgh and the resident diplomat Robert Bowes borrowed £300 sterling from Robert Jousie, Thomas Foulis, and John Porterfield in order to reward potential supporters of English policy.

Textiles for the royal wardrobes
In 1590 Sir William Keith of Delny, out-going Keeper of the Royal Wardrobe, paid Jousie 10,000 Scottish merks for silk fabrics already supplied to the king. Jousie was owed a further £19,000 for "apparel and other necessaries" supplied to the king at the time of marriage.

In the 1590s, Robert Jousie supplied fabrics to the tailors Alexander Miller and Peter Sanderson who worked for the keepers of the royal wardrobes Sir George Home and Søren Johnson. The fabric contract was in part financed by money sent as a gift or subsidy to James VI by Queen Elizabeth. Fowlis and Jousie continued to make purchases in London for the king, filling four trunks and four packs in 1593.

Jousie provided textiles for the Masque at the baptism of Prince Henry in 1594. These were financed by using Anna of Denmark's dowry, which had been invested in various towns. Jousie received £1000 from Aberdeen.

In July 1594 he was paid £18,280 Scots from the English subsidy or annuity money sent to James VI, for the clothes he had supplied to the king and queen.

Sir Robert Melville resigned as Treasurer of Scotland in March 1595. He owed Jousie £20,000 which the king undertook to repay. His daughter-in-law, Margaret Ker, owed Jousie a personal debt of £233.

In September 1597 Jousie went to London to collect the annuity and carried letters from John Lindsay of Balcarres to William and Robert Cecil. He was delayed in England waiting for the subsidy. James VI wrote to Elizabeth I about his "endless detaining", saying that Jousie's "errand, it is turned from an honourable annuity to a volutntary uncertainty almost after long begging".

Bankrupt
Foulis was bankrupted in 1598. He gave a statement of his debts to Parliament, which included £145,700 and interest on that sum to £33,000 Scots. The roll submitted to Parliament listed the names of the creditors of Foulis and Jousie, who had loaned them money with which they financed the court. It includes the Edinburgh Company of Tailors, based on the Cowgate, who had lent £1,200, the merchant and poet John Burell, and Bartholomew Kello, the husband of the calligrapher Esther Inglis. Kello's loan of £4,000 was one of the larger contributions, and the merchant Jacob Baron had invested £14,822 Scots.

In May 1598 James Hudson wrote that Foulis had pawned a gold lion set with a ruby worth £400 with the London goldsmith Robert Brook of Lombard Street, which Hudson suggested belonged to James VI. Robert Jousie was unable to pay Brook's interest or other sums due by Hudson, or the money they jointly owed to Hudson. Hudson considered having Jousie arrested for debt in London.

Despite the bankruptcy, the purchasing arrangement for the royal wardrobe continued, and he bought a sapphire engraved with Elizabeth's portrait in London for Anna of Denmark in January 1599. However, the English creditors of Thomas Foulis arrested Jousie in London for debts and he was imprisoned for a time. Despite the efforts of James Elphinstone, the Secretary of State, Sir Robert Cecil could not assist to free him until there was some assurance of repayment. In February 1599 the Privy Council declared that in future the Treasurer would administer the English annuity or subsidy, spending it on clothes for the royal family and the household of Prince Henry.

The English textile merchant and financier Baptist Hicks wrote to James VI on 1 March 1599 hoping for repayment of sums due to him by Jousie. He had written twice to the king, and was disappointed to hear from the Scottish ambassador that he would not be paid from the annuity awarded by Queen Elizabeth.

England
In England, after the Union of the Crowns, Jousie was appointed Groom of the Bedchamber, Groom or Yeoman of the Robes, and deputy Keeper of the Privy Purse, in the years 1606 to 1611. He was Yeoman of the Robes to Prince Henry.

In October 1606 George Home, now the Earl of Dunbar, sent him to give money to the minister Andrew Melville and his colleagues, in packets disguised as sugar loaves.

Jousie bought an estate at Baynards in Surrey in 1610.

When William Betoun, the embroiderer to the royal family in Scotland, died in 1620, Robert Jousie still owed him 800 merks.

Robert Jousie died in London in 1626, without making a will, and details of his family are unclear. The historian Dr Robert Johnston (d. 1639) was at his deathbed.

Family
Jousie's wife was called Margaret. They had two sons and a daughter.
 James Jousie or Jossey alias Hay, mortgaged their interests in the Baynards estate to Richard Gurnard or Gurney (d. 1647), a London clothworker. Gurney sold it to Richard Evelyn, the father of diarist John Evelyn, who acquired the whole property in 1631. James Jousie of Baynards married a daughter of George Heriot (1563-1624), Elizabeth Band. 
 Robert Jousie, who went to Spain with Prince Charles in 1623, and came to Edinburgh in 1633 with Charles I as Yeoman of the Robes.
 Elizabeth (b. 1609), described as a gentlewoman, married James Heriot (d. 1634) on 4 January 1624. He was a jeweller to Charles I of England, and a son of George Heriot (died 1610), at St Mary Magdalen, Bermondsey. After James Heriot's death, Elizabeth Jousie married David Cunningham of Robertland in 1637, who corresponded with his cousin, the receiver of royal rents, David Cunningham of Auchenharvie about the match. Auchenharvie mentioned her in his letters as Heriot's "sweet bedfellow" and wrote in 1635 that "she is yet a widow but not like to continue, being much importuned with sundry suitors of quality". Auchenharvie sided with Elizabeth Jousie and Robert Jousie junior in a lawsuit in 1636.

A friend and relation, John Jousie (d. 1621), was a wealthy Scottish  merchant resident in London. He made Robert Joussie of Baynards and Robert Johnston his executors and left money to Johnson and Robert Jousie's friend, John Fortune. He made several legacies in Scottish money and to the poor in the Hospital of Edinburgh. His son, also John Jousie, may have been a merchant in Edinburgh.

Another member of the Heriot family, also called George Heriot, who died in London in July 1625 was described as Robert Jousie's servitor or servant.

A cargo in 1586
A list of goods belonging to Robert Jousie in a ship's cargo of 1586 survives to give some idea of his business. He lost; a dozen hats lined with taffeta worth £20; 15 beaver hats worth £76, 12 hats lined with taffeta worth £27; 36 hat bands worth £14; 24 hat bands of silk crêpe worth £23; 12 crêpe hat bands worth £6; 24 hat bands for children worth 22 shillings.  The ship had run aground in Norfolk.

Robert Jousie's house in Edinburgh
In June 1593 Jousie's house in Edinburgh was the scene of a scandalous abduction, while he was travelling to London. James Gray, a servant of James VI and brother of the Master of Gray, had abducted and married Catherine Carnegie daughter of John, Laird of Carnegie, and niece of David Carnegie of Colluthie. She protested and was given a refuge in Robert Jousie's house. Gray sent his friend John Wemyss of Logie to quietly break into the house. When Logie discovered that she was still inside, he signalled to his accomplices including Sir James Sandilands to break down the doors and carry her back to Gray, while Lord Home and his followers prevented any would-be rescuers intervening. Catherine eventually married Sir John Hamilton of Lettrick.

The house was apparently the scene of a rope trick on 10 July 1598, when an acrobat performed on a cable between the fore-stair of the house and the steeple of St Giles.

References

Court of James VI and I
16th-century Scottish people
17th-century Scottish people
1626 deaths
Old Town, Edinburgh
Scottish merchants
16th-century Scottish businesspeople
Businesspeople from Edinburgh
Year of birth unknown